Haskett (alternately Hesketh, Heskett, Heskit, Haskett, Hasketts, Hackett etc.) is an English surname of Norman origin. People bearing the name include:

Chris Haskett (born 1962), American guitarist
Dan Haskett (born 1952), African-American animator who designed "Belle" for Disney’s Beauty and the Beast
Dianne Haskett (born 1955), mayor of London, Ontario, Canada, from 1994 to 2000
Jack Haskett (1911–1992), Australian rules footballer
Jane Haskett Bock (née Haskett), professor emerita in biology at the University of Colorado, Boulder
Irwin Haskett (1903–1994), Canadian politician and cabinet minister
Max Haskett, former trumpet player in the American rock band Starship

See also
Askett
Hassett (disambiguation)
Hesket (disambiguation)

References

Surnames of English origin